The Undisputed Truth is an American music group.

The Undisputed Truth may also refer to:
 The Undisputed Truth (Undisputed Truth album), 1971
 The Undisputed Truth (Brother Ali album), 2007
 The Undisputed Truth (Seventh Star album), 2007